Joseph Wu Qinjing (born November 11, 1968) is a Chinese Catholic priest and the current bishop of Zhouzhi since 2005.

Biography
Wu was born in Wufeng Village of Xingping, Shaanxi, on November 11, 1968. After high school in 1989, he was accepted to Shanghai Sheshan Seminary, where he graduated in 1995.

He was ordained a priest by Yang Guangyan on February 11, 1996. In 2000, he went to the United States for further study. Three years later, he received a master's degree in etiquette theology from St. John's University, Minnesota. After receiving a master's degree from Fordham University in New York in 2005, he returned home and continued to teach at Shaanxi Seminary.

In September 2006, he was put under house arrest by the Communist government. He was released in 2014.

In 2010 he was elected Bishop of the Roman Catholic Diocese of Zhouzhi. He accepted the episcopacy with the papal mandate on October 19, 2005.

References

1968 births
People from Xianyang
Living people
College of Saint Benedict and Saint John's University alumni
Fordham University alumni
21st-century Roman Catholic bishops in China